Moran College, established in 1964, is a general degree college situated at Moran, in Charaideo district, Assam. This college is affiliated with the Dibrugarh University. This College offers Higher Secondary and bachelor's degree courses in science and arts.

References

External links

Universities and colleges in Assam
Colleges affiliated to Dibrugarh University
Educational institutions established in 1964
1964 establishments in Assam